Cirkus Columbia is a 2010 Bosnian drama film starring Miki Manojlović, Mira Furlan, Boris Ler and Jelena Stupljanin. The film is set in the Herzegovina part of Bosnia and Herzegovina in the early 1990s, after the dissolution of Yugoslavia, and slightly before the Yugoslav Wars. It tells an emotional story of a man coming back to his hometown after many years abroad and dealing with his past and current family, using the political dealings of the region as a backdrop. It is based on the novel Cirkus Columbia by well known Bosnian Croat writer Ivica Đikić.

Cast
Miki Manojlović - Divko Buntić
Mira Furlan - Lucija
Boris Ler - Martin Buntić
Jelena Stupljanin - Azra
Milan Štrljić - Ranko Ivanda
Mario Knezović - Pivac
Svetislav Goncić - Savo
Ines Fančović - Starica
Ermin Bravo - Fra Ante Gudelj
Mirsad Tuka - Dragan
Slaven Knezović - Miro
Izudin Bajrović - Major Kostelić

Reception
The film received mixed reviews. Review aggregator Rotten Tomatoes reports that the film has an overall approval rating of 80%, based on 10 reviews, with a weighted average rating of 6.5/10. Deborah Young wrote in The Hollywood Reporter that the film "rings with authenticity and weight", and presents absorbing characters, yet "the script by Tanovic and Ivica Dikic is simple to a fault, becoming utterly predictable in the forbidden romance between Martin and his father's bride-to-be".

See also
 List of submissions to the 83rd Academy Awards for Best Foreign Language Film
 List of Bosnian submissions for the Academy Award for Best Foreign Language Film

References

External links
 

2010 films
2010 war drama films
English-language Bosnian films
Bosnian-language films
Films directed by Danis Tanović
Bosnian War films
Films set in 1991
Yugoslav Wars in fiction
Bosnia and Herzegovina drama films
2010 drama films